Beerbach may refer to:
 Beerbach (Mergbach), a river of Hesse, Germany, tributary of the Mergbach
 Beerbach (Modau), a river of Hesse, Germany, tributary of the Modau
 Ober-Beerbach, a village of Seeheim-Jugenheim in Hesse, Germany
 Beerbach (Abenberg), a district of Abenberg in Bavaria, Germany